Henry Swenson Wingo (born October 4, 1995) is an American professional soccer player who plays as a midfielder for Ferencvárosi TC in the Nemzeti Bajnokság I.

Career

Early career
Henry Wingo spent time as a youth playing for Northwest Nationals and Crossfire FC.  Wingo then played for two seasons as part of the Seattle Sounders Academy where he scored 12 goals.

Wingo played for three seasons at the University of Washington. During his time at UW, Wingo scored two goals and added four assists in 58 matches. With his efforts he earned All-Pac-12 Second Team honors in 2015 and 2016.

He also played in the Premier Development League for Puget Sound Gunners.

Seattle Sounders FC
Wingo was signed as a Homegrown Player on January 18, 2017.  Wingo made his professional debut on March 4, coming on as a substitute during the first game of the 2017 season in a 2–1 loss to Houston.

Molde FK
On August 12, 2019, Wingo moved to Norwegian Eliteserien side Molde FK, reuniting him with former Sounder Magnus Wolff Eikrem. He made his debut for the club on October 21, when he came in as an 89th minute substitute in Molde's 3–1 win against Haugesund. In one and half seasons with Molde, Wingo made 23 league appearances and scored two goals in the Eliteserien. He made a further 8 appearances for the club in both the UEFA Europa League and the UEFA Champions League.

Ferencváros 
On January 18, 2021, Ferencváros announced through its Twitter account that the club had signed Wingo from Molde. Wingo made his debut for the club on January 27, coming on in the 80th minute in a 3–0 win against Budafoki MTE.

Personal life
Wingo's brother, Teddy, played professionally in Norway for Stryn FK.
Henry grew up in Lake Forest Park, Washington, a suburb of Seattle.  Since the age of 3, Henry and his brothers Teddy and Connor were raised by their single mother Erica. Henry Wingo attended Shorecrest High School in Shoreline, Washington.

Career statistics

Honors
Molde
 Eliteserien: 2019

Ferencváros
Nemzeti Bajnokság I: 2020–21, 2021–22
 Magyar Kupa: 2021–22

Individual
 All-Pac-12 Selection: Second Team 2015, 2016

References

External links

1995 births
Living people
American soccer players
Washington Huskies men's soccer players
Puget Sound Gunners FC players
Seattle Sounders FC players
Tacoma Defiance players
Molde FK players
Ferencvárosi TC footballers
Association football midfielders
Soccer players from Washington (state)
USL League Two players
Major League Soccer players
USL Championship players
Nemzeti Bajnokság I players
Eliteserien players
American expatriate soccer players
Expatriate footballers in Norway
American expatriate sportspeople in Norway
Expatriate footballers in Hungary
American expatriate sportspeople in Hungary
Homegrown Players (MLS)